

This page lists board and card games, wargames, miniatures games, and tabletop role-playing games published in 1993.  For video games, see 1993 in video gaming.

Games released or invented in 1993

Game awards given in 1993
 Spiel des Jahres: Call My Bluff
 Deutscher Spiele Preis: Modern Art
Best Children's Game: Verflixt Gemixt
 Games: Inklings

Significant games-related events in 1993
Magic: The Gathering released by Wizards of the Coast, to become the first popular collectible card game.
Alderac Entertainment Group founded.

See also
 1993 in video gaming

References

Games
Games by year